Rajneeti is a 2017 Bangladeshi political thriller film. The film directed by Bulbul Biswas and produced by Ashfaq Ahmed under the banner of Arrow Motion Arts. The film story and screenplay written by Bulbul Biswas himself and dialogue by Delowar Hossain Dil. It feature Shakib Khan, Apu Biswas, Anisur Rahman Milon, Sadek Bachchu, Amit Hasan in lead roles. The film soundtrack is composed by Habib Wahid, Fuad al Muqtadir and Pritam Hasan. It was released on June 26, 2017 on the occasion on Eid al-Fitr in Bangladesh.

The film considers the politics of Bangladesh. The film created controversy. Shakib Khan used a phone number in the film that eventually turned out to be that of a rickshaw driver. That driver later sued him for $60,000 (£45,000) stating that the use of his number let millions to call to his number searching for Shakib Khan.

Cast
 Shakib Khan as Ayon Habibullah
 Apu Biswas as Arshha
 Anisur Rahman Milon as Shakil Habibullah
 Shahidul Alam Sachchu
 Sadek Bachchu as Chhand Sardar
 Amit Hasan as Jabbar Miahn
 Ali Raj
 Pijush Bandyopadhyay
 Jayashri Kaur Jaya
 Subrata Barua
 Shampa Reza
 Saberi Alam as Shanu Begum
 Rebecca
 Shiba Shanu as Nazimuddim
 DJ Sohail as Pappu
 Komol Patekar as Bullet
 Labanya Lisa as Aroti Boudi
 Bipasha Kabir as Item number (Guest appearance)

Plot
Ayon Habibullah (Shakib Khan) is an expatriate Bangladeshi. After finishing his studies in South Africa, he dreamed of opening an IT firm back in the country. His father (Ali Raj) was a famous politician from Old Dhaka. He does not want Ayon to get involved in politics in any way.

When Ayon left his job at Microsoft and returned to Bangladesh, his father and mother (Saberi Alam) were very worried. His elder brother Shakil Habibullah (Anisur Rahman Milon) loves him dearly and adopts him. When Ayon goes on a field trip, he falls in love with Arshha (Apu Biswas) and Arshha also fall in love with him. Arsha's father is the chairman of the opposition. As a result, he got into a fight with Arshha's brother Pappu (DJ Sohail) and Shakil beat Pappu to get revenge. As a result, Shakil also fell in love with Arshha. Ayon accidentally kills Pappu to save Shakil from being hit by Pappu's gun. Shakil took advantage of this opportunity to get Arshha and identifies Ayon as the Pappu's killer. After hearing the news Ayon's father had a heart attack. As a result, Ayon was forced to enter politics in place of his father. Seeing Ayon's improvement Shakil angrily left the party and joined the opposition.

Soundtrack

The film soundtrack is composed by Habib Wahid, Fuad al Muqtadir and Pritam Hasan. A total of four songs have been used in the film. The first song of the film titled is "O Akash Bole Dena Re" sung by Kheya and Shafayat (Jalali Set) sung the rap as an additional addition. The song tune and music arranged by Habib Wahid and lyrics written by Kabir Bakul. It was released on YouTube on June 14, 2017. Then its second song titled "Ghore Phire Elo Re", which was sung by Parvez Sajjad and Pritam Hasan. The song composed by Pritom Hasan himself and lyrics written by Mehedi Hasan Limon. Which was released on YouTube on June 19, 2017. The third song of the film titled is " Range Range Moner Range" released on June 22, 2017 sung by Fuad al Muqtadir, Konal and Tahsin. The song composed by Fuad al Muqtadir himself and lyrics written by (?). The fourth and last song of the film titled is "Premer, Majhe" sung by Dinat Jahan Munni. The song composed and music arranged by Pritam Hasan and written by Kabir Bakul. The song was released on YouTube on June 25, 2017. All the songs from the film were released on Sony Deadsea Bengali's YouTube channel.

Controversy
The film lead actor Shakib Khan was sued with fraud and defamation of 5 million for using the personal mobile number of a man named Ijazul Mia of Habiganj, Bangladesh, in a dialogue for the film. The film's director Bulbul Biswas and producer Ashfaq Ahmed were also charged in the same case. Autorickshaw driver Ijazul Mia filed the case in Habiganj Senior Judicial Magistrate's Court in Habiganj on 29 October 2016.

Ijazul Mia mentioned in the charge sheet of the case that, actress Apu Biswas said while giving a dialogue in a sequence of the film 'Rajneeti' (26 minutes and 12 seconds of the film), ‘I will not let go of my dream prince again and again.’ In reply actor Shakib Khan said, ‘I will never leave you, my princess.’ Apu Biswas said again, ‘How do you know that my Facebook ID is "Rajkumari"?’ In reply Shakib Khan said, ‘As you know, my mobile number is....’.

Regarding the case Khan stated, "As an artist I just delivered my dialogue. It is not my responsibility to decide whose mobile phone number it is, whether the number is correct or not. It does not come under my jurisdiction. It's the matter of the film's producer, director and scriptwriter. It turns on them. If any other hero in my place had delivered the dialogue, he had nothing to do.

References

External links
 

2017 films
Bengali-language Bangladeshi films
Films scored by Habib Wahid
2010s Bengali-language films
Best Film Bachsas Award winners
Bangladeshi political thriller films
2010s political thriller films
Films set in Bangladesh
Films scored by Fuad
2017 soundtrack albums
Films shot in Dhaka
Bangladeshi crime thriller films
2010s crime thriller films
2017 crime thriller films